The 2017–18 FIS Snowboard World Cup was the 24th World Cup season in snowboarding organised by International Ski Federation. The season started on 4 September 2017 in Cardrona, New Zealand and concluded on 24 March 2018 in Quebec City, Canada. Competitions consisted of parallel slalom, parallel giant slalom, snowboard cross, halfpipe, slopestyle and big air.

Men

Snowboard Cross

Parallel

Big Air

Halfpipe

Slopestyle

Ladies

Snowboard Cross

Parallel

Big Air

Halfpipe

Slopestyle

Team

Snowboard cross men

Snowboard cross ladies

Parallel mixed

Men's standings

Parallel overall (PSL/PGS)

Parallel slalom

Parallel giant slalom

Snowboard Cross

Freestyle overall (BA/SBS/HP)

Big Air

Halfpipe

Slopestyle

Ladies' standings

Parallel overall (PSL/PGS)

Parallel slalom

Parallel giant slalom

Snowboard Cross

Freestyle overall (BA/SBS/HP)

Big Air

Halfpipe

Slopestyle

References 

FIS Snowboard World Cup
FIS Snowboard World Cup
FIS Snowboard World Cup